Matylda Damięcka (born 10 June 1985) is a Polish actress who works primarily in television.

Family
Damięcka comes from an acting family. Her grandparents were Dobiesław Damięcki and Irena Górska-Damięcka, and her parents are Maciej Damięcki and Joanna Damięcki. She is the sister of Mateusz Damięcki, the niece of Damian Damięcki, and cousin of Grzegorz Damięcki.

Selected filmography

References

External links
 

1985 births
Living people
Actresses from Warsaw
Polish soap opera actresses
Polish voice actresses